The HAL Advanced Medium Combat Aircraft (AMCA) is an Indian programme to develop a fifth-generation stealth, multirole combat aircraft for the Indian Air Force and the Indian Navy which will also include sixth-generation technologies. The design of the aircraft is carried out by Aeronautical Development Agency (ADA) of Defence Research and Development Organisation (DRDO). It is expected to be produced by a public-private joint venture between the DRDO, Hindustan Aeronautics Limited (HAL), and an Indian private company. The development cost is estimated to be around ₹15,000 crore (~$2 billion). As of February 2023, DRDO has completed design of AMCA and is waiting for Critical Design Review, which according to The Indian Express, is a technical review to ensure that the system of an aircraft can proceed into fabrication, demonstration and test and can meet performance requirements.

AMCA will be a single-seat, twin-engine aircraft. The AMCA Mark 1 will come equipped with 5.5 generation technologies and Mark 2 will have the incremental 6th generation technology upgrades. The AMCA is intended to perform a multitude of missions including Air supremacy, Ground-Strike, Suppression of Enemy Air Defenses (SEAD) and Electronic Warfare (EW) missions. It is intended to be a potent replacement for the Sukhoi Su-30MKI air superiority fighter, which forms the backbone of the IAF fighter fleet.

The AMCA design is optimised for low radar cross section and supercruise capability. Feasibility study on AMCA and the preliminary design stage have been completed, and the project entered the detailed design phase in February 2019. The AMCA is currently the only 5th generation fighter under development in India.

Some analysts have questioned the feasibility of India's ability to independently develop a fifth generation fighter aircraft as India lacks the industrial base and technical capabilities to do so. India also lacks a robust military industrial base to manufacture the aircraft in large numbers. Advocating that India should either elicit foreign collaboration or join a multi-national fighter program such as the European FCAS which would benefit the development of the AMCA project.

Development

AMCA Program

The AMCA programme, earlier known as Medium Combat Aircraft (MCA) programme, is an Indian programme to develop a fifth-generation fighter. It began as a parallel programme to the Indo-Russia Sukhoi/HAL FGFA. The AMCA programme was launched in 2010. Although envisioned as a 20-tonne class fighter earlier, now AMCA is 25-tonne class fighter. A feasibility study was launched in October 2010, followed by Project Definition and Preliminary Design phase in 2013. From November 2013 to December 2014, 9 design configurations of AMCA, starting from 3B-01 to 3B-09, were studied using CAD, low-speed - high-speed wind tunnel testing, and radar cross section (RCS) testing. By the end of 2014, configuration 3B-09 was chosen. In 2015, the basic design configuration of AMCA was finalized, and has been accepted by IAF in 2016. As of October 2022, the AMCA is yet to get Cabinet Committee on Security (CSS) approval, which is essential for prototype development. According to Dr A.K. Ghosh, project director of AMCA, "Once the project sanction is received, the prototype can be rolled out in three years and the first flight in one to one and (a) half years after that".

The IAF plan to procure at least 125 AMCA in Mark-1 and Mark-2 configurations. The Mark 2 of AMCA is expected to have a more powerful engine, sixth-generation features and technologies to stay relevant in the coming decades.

Sixth-generation
India currently working on its stealth fighter AMCA which will have sixth-generation technologies. In an interview given in 2020, the then Air force Chief R. K. S. Bhadauria stated that "The planning process is already underway for combat systems like optionally manned sixth generation technologies, smart wingman concept, swarm drones, long persistent HALE (High Altitude Long Endurance) platforms and hypersonic weapons, among others. He also added that it is imperative to incorporate such advanced technologies to keep AMCA relevant. It is also reaffirmed by IAF's current chief Vivek Ram Chaudhari.

Design

Overview
The AMCA is a twin-engine, stealth supersonic multi-role fighter designed for the IAF. At present, the AMCA is planned as a fifth generation fighter but will integrate emerging, best of breed sixth generation technologies over time. The AMCA would be the first fifth generation fighter to enter service with the Indian Air Force.

The AMCA is designed with shoulder mounted diamond shaped trapezoidal wings, a profile with substantial area-ruling to reduce drag at transonic speeds, and a stabilator V-tail with large fuselage mounted tail-wing. Flight control surfaces include leading and trailing-edge flaps, ailerons, rudders on the canted vertical stabilizers, and all-moving tailplanes; these surfaces also serve as air brakes. The cockpit features a single seat configuration which is placed high, near the air intakes and wings of the aircraft to provide good visibility to the pilot with a single bubble canopy. A leading-edge root extension (LERX), which is a small fillet, is situated on the front section of the intake and wings of the aircraft. It has a typically roughly rectangular shape, running forward from the leading edge of the wing root to a point along the fuselage. The aircraft features a tricycle landing gear configuration. The weapons bay is placed on the underside of the fuselage between the nose and main landing gear. The AMCA is designed to produce a very small radar cross-section, to accomplish this it features “S-shaped” air-intakes to reduce radar exposure to the fan blade which increases stealth, uses an internal weapons bay and features the use of composites and other materials. The flight control surfaces are controlled by a central management computer system. The AMCA will have some sixth generation characteristics such as an optionally crewed, directed energy weapons, capable of controlling UCAVs and swarm drones.

Stealth and radar signature
The AMCA design has inherent radar stealth, achieved through twin-tail layout, platform edge alignment and serration, body conformal antenna and low intercept radar, diverterless supersonic inlet (DSI) with serpentine ducts which conceal engine fan blades, internal weapons bay and extensive use of composites in airframe. According to Janes Information Services quoting ADA, the airframe of AMCA will have 38–40% composite. As of October 2022, designers are still in the process of refining the radar deflection capability of AMCA.

Sensors and avionics
The AMCA is expected to have distributed passive sensors with Artificial intelligence (AI) assisted multi-sensor data fusion to increase situational awareness and to work in tandem with the advanced electronic warfare (EW) suite onboard AMCA. The AMCA has a distributed processing system employing fast processors and smart subsystems. The AMCA will also have an integrated vehicle health monitoring system which works on sensor fusion.

AMCA will be equipped with a larger and powerful variant of the Uttam AESA Radar which will use gallium nitride (GaN) technology. It will be mounted on a mechanically steerable mount. An onboard condition monitoring system is also planned to be included in the AMCA.

Cockpit
The AMCA will have a glass cockpit equipped with a wide panoramic touchscreen display for enhanced man-machine interaction, a multi function display (MFD) placed in portrait orientation and a wide-angle holographic head-up display (HUD). The AMCA will have hands-on throttle-and-stick (HOTAS) arrangement with right hand on stick and left hand on throttle settings to ease the pilot workload.

Propulsion
The AMCA is to be powered by two afterburning turbofan engines. The plan is to equip General Electric F414 afterburning turbofan engine on AMCA Mark-1, while a more powerful joint venture (JV) engine is planned for AMCA Mark-2.

As per Government statement in Rajya Sabha during Winter Session 2021, there is a proposal to jointly develop engine for AMCA with the help of foreign partner using the know how from Kaveri engine development programme.

Armament
The AMCA features an internal weapons bay for carrying missiles and standoff precision guided munitions in stealthy configuration, while also has provision for external hardpoints for carrying ordinance externally for non-stealthy missions. Directed energy weapons are also planned to be equipped on the AMCA.

Operators

Indian Air Force – 7 squadrons (planned)

Specifications (projected)
Specifications can vary as the aircraft is still in development. All the informations are based on available non-official sources - approximate and preliminary.

See also

References

Notes

References

External links

Flight videos and photos
Images of a model of the re-designed AMCA Fighter at Aero India – 2013
HAL AMCA official video
 BASIC FLIGHT SIMULATOR FOR AMCA

Indian military aircraft procurement programs
Twinjets
Mid-wing aircraft
V-tail aircraft
AMCA
Stealth aircraft
Carrier-based aircraft
Proposed aircraft of India
Proposed military aircraft